The 1957–58 Nationalliga A season was the 20th season of the Nationalliga A, the top level of ice hockey in Switzerland. Eight teams participated in the league, and HC Davos won the championship.

Regular season

Relegation 
 HC La Chaux-de-Fonds - SC Bern 4:11

External links
 Championnat de Suisse 1957/58

National League (ice hockey) seasons
Swiss
1957–58 in Swiss ice hockey